Carolina Cerezuela Gil (born 14 January 1980 in Elche, Alicante, Spain) is a Spanish actress who became famous playing Mónica Salazar in Camera Café, the Spanish spin-off of Caméra Café.

In 2001, she won the beauty prize Linda of Spain. She studied Labour Relations in the Miguel Hernández University of Elche in the province of Alicante. Her acting career began in the theater aged 15, and in spite of never having studied drama, she began to work in television aged 20.

In 2007, she appeared on the cover of the Spanish November edition of FHM.

Theater 
 Cuatro corazones con freno y marcha atrás (1996) by Jardiel Poncela
 Hombres (1997) by Sergi Belbel.
 Te odio amor mío (1998) based on texts of Dorothy Parker.
 Criaturas (1999)
 El enfermo imaginario - Le Malade imaginaire - The Imaginary Invalid (or The Hypochondriac) (2000) by Molière.

Television

Actress 
 Arrayán (television series) 2003 in the role of Julia
 El Secreto (telenovela) 2002 in the role of Charlie
 La verdad de Laura (telenovela) 2002 in the role of Eva
 Paraíso (television series) 2003 in the role of Susi
 Aquí no hay quien viva (television series) 2004 in the role of Vanessa
 Paco y Veva (television series) 2004 in the role of a manager
 Camera Café (television series) 2005-2009 in the role of Mónica Salazar
 Los Serrano (television series) 2006 in the role of Candy 
 Amistades peligrosas (television series) 2006 in the role of Helena García
 Manolo & Benito Corporeision (television series) 2006-2007 in the role of Lola
 Hospital Central (television series) 2007-2009 in the role of Verónica Solé
 ¡Fibrilando! (television series) 2009 in the role of Mónica Salazar

Presenter 
 Esto es increíble 2006-2007
 Especial Nochevieja de Telecinco together with Emilio Pineda and Carmen Alcayde
 ¿Xq no te callas? (television series) 2008 together with Eugeni Alemany

Singer 
 Manzana de Caramelo 2016 with singer Jaime Anglada as Anglada Cerezuela

References

External links
 Photos and information on Carolina Cerezuela this link ends with advertising.
 Web devoted to Carolina Cerezuela
 

1980 births
Living people
Spanish television actresses
Spanish television presenters
People from Elche
Spanish stage actresses
Spanish women television presenters
21st-century Spanish actresses